The 1977 Isle of Man TT took place between 11 June – 17 June 1977, at the Snaefell Mountain Course. 1977 marked the beginning of an era as it was the first time the Isle of Man TT did not appear on the Grand Prix calendar.

Senior TT (500 cc) classification

Junior TT (250 cc) classification

1000 cc Classic TT classification

Jubilee 1000 cc TT classification

Formula One TT classification

Formula Two TT classification

Formula Three TT classification

1000 cc Sidecar TT Race One classification

1000 cc Sidecar TT Race Two classification

References

1977 in the Isle of Man
Isle of Man TT
Isle of Man TT
June 1977 sports events in the United Kingdom
Isle